CALLISTO (Cooperative Action Leading to Launcher Innovation in Stage Toss-back Operations) is a single stage and reusable VTVL demonstrator propelled by rocket engine and developed jointly by the German Aerospace Center, the French Space Agency, and the Japanese Aerospace Exploration Agency. 

The goals are to mature and demonstrate the technologies which are necessary to build and operate a reusable launch vehicle, but also to better assess the operational cost of such a vehicle. The first flight is planned for 2022.

Eventually, lessons learned with the development of CALLISTO will pave the way to develop the European reusable launcher Ariane Next.

See also
 Themis programme
 Prometheus (rocket engine)
 Ariane Next

References

Reusable launch systems
Partially reusable space launch vehicles
Space launch vehicles of Europe
Space programs
European space programmes
Spaceflight technology